The Chundrigar are a Muslim community found in the state of Gujarat, India. A few are also found in the city of Karachi, Pakistan.

History and origin

The Chundrigars are a Gujarati speaking community, associated with the silk knot printing and manufacture of a piece of cloth known as the chunri or dupata. They claim to have been Arabs who settled in Sindh and then moved to Gujarat. There largest concentration is the city of Surat, although there is a large diaspora in Karachi. According to some traditions, the community are a sub-group within the Manihar community. This is shown by the fact the community intermarry with the Manihars, and are members of the Gujarat Manihar Jamat. Almost all the Chundrigar community have abandoned their traditional occupation. They are now mainly a community of petty traders, with a few successful businessmen.

With the independence of Pakistan in 1947, many moved to the newly created Muslim state of Pakistan. Ibrahim Ismail Chundrigar served as Pakistan's finance minister and later as Prime Minister of Pakistan.

References

Social groups of Gujarat
Muslim communities of India
Shaikh clans
Muslim communities of Gujarat